The Diocese of Trujillo may refer to:

Roman Catholic Archdiocese of Trujillo, Peru
Roman Catholic Diocese of Trujillo (Honduras)
Roman Catholic Diocese of Trujillo, Venezuela